René Binggeli (Geneva, 17 January 1941 — Geneva, 27 September 2007) was a Swiss professional road bicycle racer. Binggeli won a stage in the 1965 Giro d'Italia and in the 1967 Tour de France.

Major results

1960
Porrentruy-Zürich
1963
Mont Agel
1965
Giro d'Italia:
Winner stage 22
1967
Tour de France:
Winner stage 22A
GP Piquet

External links 

Official Tour de France results for René Bingelli

Swiss male cyclists
1941 births
2007 deaths
Swiss Tour de France stage winners
Swiss Giro d'Italia stage winners
Cyclists from Geneva